Cosmetics are constituted mixtures of chemical compounds derived from either natural sources, or synthetically created ones. Cosmetics have various purposes. Those designed for personal care and skin care can be used to cleanse or protect the body or skin. Cosmetics designed to enhance or alter one's appearance (makeup) can be used to conceal blemishes, enhance one's natural features (such as the eyebrows and eyelashes), add color to a person's face, or change the appearance of the face entirely to resemble a different person, creature or object. Cosmetics can also be designed to add fragrance to the body.

Definition and etymology 

Cosmetics are constituted from a mixture of chemical compounds derived from either natural sources, or synthetically created ones.

Legal definition 

Though the legal definition of cosmetics in most countries is broader, in some Western countries, cosmetics are commonly taken to mean only makeup products, such as lipstick, mascara, eye shadow, foundation, blush, highlighter, bronzer, and several other product types.

In the United States, the Food and Drug Administration (FDA), which regulates cosmetics, defines cosmetics as products "intended to be applied to the human body for cleansing, beautifying, promoting attractiveness, or altering the appearance without affecting the body's structure or functions". This broad definition includes any material intended for use as an ingredient of a cosmetic product, with the FDA specifically excluding pure soap from this category.

Use 
Cosmetics designed for skin care can be used to cleanse, exfoliate and protect the skin, as well as replenishing it, by the use of cleansers, toners, serums, moisturizers, and balms. Cosmetics designed for more general personal care, such as shampoo and body wash, can be used to cleanse the body.

Cosmetics designed to enhance one's appearance (makeup) can be used to conceal blemishes, enhance one's natural features (such as the eyebrows and eyelashes), add color to a person's face and—in the case of more extreme forms of makeup used for performances, fashion shows and people in costume—can be used to change the appearance of the face entirely to resemble a different person, creature or object. Techniques for changing appearance include contouring, which aims to give shape to an area of the face.

Cosmetics can also be designed to add fragrance to the body.

History 

Cosmetics have been in use for thousands of years, with ancient Egyptians and Sumerians using them. In Europe, use of cosmetics continued into the Middle Ages—where the face was whitened and the cheeks rouged— though attitudes towards cosmetics varied throughout time, with the use of cosmetics being openly frowned upon at many points in Western history. Regardless of the changes in social attitudes towards cosmetics, ideals of appearance were occasionally achieved through the use of cosmetics by many.

According to one source, early major developments in cosmetics include:
 Kohl used by ancient Egyptians
 Castor oil also used in ancient Egypt as a protective balm
 Skin creams made of beeswax, olive oil, and rose water, described by the Romans
 Vaseline and lanolin in the nineteenth century.

Historically, the absence of regulation of the manufacture and use of cosmetics, as well as the absence of scientific knowledge regarding the effects of various compounds on the human body for much of this time period, led to a number of negative adverse effects upon those who used cosmetics, including deformities, blindness and in some cases death.  Many cosmetic products available at this time were still either chemically dubious or derived from natural resources commonly found in the kitchen, such as food colouring, berries and beetroot. Examples of the prevalent usage of harmful cosmetics include the use of ceruse (white lead) throughout a number of different cultures, such as during the Renaissance in the West, and blindness caused by the mascara Lash Lure during the early 20th century. During the 19th century, there was a high number of incidences of lead poisoning due to the fashion for red and white lead makeup and powder, leading to swelling and inflammation of the eyes, weakened tooth enamel and blackening skin, with heavy use known to lead to death. Usage of white lead was not confined only to the West, with the white Japanese face makeup known as  also produced using white lead. In the second part of the 19th century, scientific advances in the production of makeup lead to the creation of makeup free of hazardous substances such as lead.

Throughout the later 19th century and early 20th century, changes in the prevailing attitudes towards cosmetics led to the wider expansion of the cosmetics industry. In 1882, English actress and socialite Lillie Langtry became the poster-girl for Pears of London, making her the first celebrity to endorse a commercial product. She allowed her name to be used on face powders and skin products. During the 1910s, the market in the US was developed by figures such as Elizabeth Arden, Helena Rubinstein, and Max Factor. These firms were joined by Revlon just before World War II and Estée Lauder just after. By the middle of the 20th century, cosmetics were in widespread use by women in nearly all industrial societies around the world, with the cosmetics industry becoming a multibillion-dollar enterprise by the beginning of the 21st century. The wider acceptance of the use of cosmetics led some to see makeup as a tool utilised in the oppression and subjection of women to unfair societal standards. In 1968 at the feminist Miss America protest, protestors symbolically threw a number of feminine products into a "Freedom Trash Can", with cosmetics among the items the protestors called "instruments of female torture" and accoutrements of what they perceived to be enforced femininity.

, the world's largest cosmetics company is L'Oréal, founded by Eugène Schueller in 1909 as the French Harmless Hair Colouring Company (now owned by Liliane Bettencourt 26% and Nestlé 28%; the remaining 46% is traded publicly). 

Although modern makeup has been traditionally used mainly by women, men also use makeup to enhance their own facial features or cover blemishes and dark circles. The negative stigma of men wearing makeup in countries such as the United States has weakened over the years, with numbers increasing in the 21st century. Cosmetics brands have increasingly targeted men in the sale of cosmetics, with some products targeted specifically at men.

Types
Though there are a large number of differing cosmetics used for a variety of different purposes, all cosmetics are typically intended to be applied externally. These products can be applied to the face (on the skin, lips, eyebrows and eyes), to the body (on the skin, in particular the hands and nails), and to the hair. These products may be intended for use as skincare, personal care or to alter the appearance, with the subset of cosmetics known as makeup primarily referring to products containing colour pigments intended for the purpose of altering the wearer's appearance; some manufacturers will distinguish only between "decorative" cosmetics intended to alter the appearance and "care" cosmetics designed for skincare and personal care.

Most cosmetics are also distinguished by the area of the body intended for application, with cosmetics designed to be used on the face and eye area usually applied with a brush, a makeup sponge, or the fingertips. Cosmetics can be also described by the physical composition of the product. Cosmetics can be liquid or cream emulsions, powders (pressed or loose), dispersions, or anhydrous creams or sticks.

Decorative
 Primers are used on the face before makeup is applied, creating a typically transparent, smooth layer over the top of the skin, allowing for makeup to be applied smoothly and evenly. Some primers may also be tinted, and this tint may match the wearer's skin tone, or may colour correct it, using greens, oranges and purples to even out the wearer's skin tone and correct redness, purple shadows or orange discolouration respectively.
 Concealer is a cream or liquid product used to conceal marks or blemishes of the skin. Concealer is typically the colour of the user's skin tone, and is generally applied after the face has been primed to even out the wearer's skin tone before foundation can be applied. Concealer is usually more heavily pigmented, higher coverage and thicker than foundation or tinted primers. Though concealer is often more heavy duty in terms of pigment and consistency than foundation, a number of different formulations intended for different styles of use - such as a lighter concealer for the eyes and a heavier concealer for stage makeup - are available, as well as colour correcting concealers intended to balance out discolouration of the skin specifically.
 Foundation is a cream, liquid, mousse or powder product applied to the entirety of the face to create a smooth and even base in the user's skin tone. Foundation provides a generally lower amount of coverage than concealer, and is sold in formulations that can provide sheer, matte, dewy or full coverage to the skin.
 Rouge, blush, or blusher is a liquid, cream or powder product applied to the centre of the cheeks with the intention of adding or enhancing their natural colour. Blushers are typically available in shades of pink or warm tan and brown, and may also be used to make the cheekbones appear more defined.
 Bronzer is a powder, cream or liquid product that adds colour to the skin, typically in bronze or tan shades intended to give the skin a tanned appearance and enhance the colour of the face. Bronzer, like highlighter, may also contain substances providing a shimmer or glitter effect, and comes in either matte, semi-matte, satin, or shimmer finishes.
 Highlighter is a liquid, cream or powder product applied to the high points of the face such as the eyebrows, nose and cheekbones. Highlighter commonly has substances added providing a shimmer or glitter effect. Alternatively, a lighter toned foundation or concealer can be used as a highlighter.
 Eyebrow pencils, creams, waxes, gels, and powders are used to color, fill in, and define the brows. Eyebrow tinting treatments are also used to dye the eyebrow hairs a darker colour, either temporarily or permanently, without staining and colouring the skin underneath the eyebrows.
 Eyeshadow is a powder, cream or liquid pigmented product used to draw attention to, accentuate and change the shape of the area around the eyes, on the eyelid and the space below the eyebrows. Eyeshadow is typically applied using an eyeshadow brush, with generally small and rounded bristles, though liquid and cream formulations may also be applied with the fingers. Eyeshadow is available in almost every colour, as well as being sold in a number of different finishes, ranging from matte finishes with sheer coverage to glossy, shimmery, glittery and highly pigmented finishes. Many different colours and finishes of eyeshadow may be combined in one look and blended together to achieve different effects.
 Eyeliner is used to enhance and elongate the apparent size or depth of the eye; though eyeliner is commonly black, it can come in many different colours, including brown, white and blue. Eyeliner can come in the form of a pencil, a gel or a liquid.
 False eyelashes are used to extend, exaggerate and add volume to the eyelashes. Consisting generally of a small strip to which hair - either human, mink or synthetic - is attached, false eyelashes are typically applied to the lash line using glue, which can come in latex and latex free varieties; magnetic false eyelashes, which attach to the eyelid after magnetic eyeliner is applied, are also available. Designs vary in length and colour, with rhinestones, gems, feathers and lace available as false eyelash designs. False eyelashes are not permanent, and can be easily taken off with the fingers. Eyelash extensions are a more permanent way to achieve this look. Each set lasts for two to three weeks, then the set can be filled, similar to the maintenance of acrylic nails. To apply to extensions the certified lash artist would start by taping down the bottom eyelashes. The lash artist would then use two tweezers, one to isolate the natural eyelash and one to apply the false eyelash. An individual false eyelash, or lash fan, is applied to one natural eyelash using a lash glue specific for this process. The eyelashes should not be stuck together. The length and thickness of the false lash should not be to heavy for the natural eyelash. If this process is done correctly no harm will be done to the natural eyelashes.
 Mascara is used to darken, lengthen, thicken, or enhance the eyelashes through the use of a typically thick, cream consistency product applied with a spiral bristle mascara brush. Mascara is commonly black, brown or clear, though a number of different colours, some containing glitter, are available. Mascara is typically advertised and sold in a number of different formulations that advertise qualities such as waterproofing, volume enhancement, length enhancement and curl enhancement, and may be used in combination with an eyelash curler to enhance the natural curl of the eyelashes.
 Lip products, including lipstick, lip gloss, lip liner and lip balms, commonly add color and texture to the lips, as well as serving to moisturise the lips and define their external edges. Products adding colour and texture to the lips, such as lipsticks and lip glosses, often come in a wide range of colours, as well as a number of different finishes, such as matte finishes and satin or glossy finishes. Other styles of lip colouration products such as lip stains temporarily saturate the lips with a dye, and typically do not alter the texture of the lips. Both lip colour products and lip liners may be waterproof, and may be applied directly to the lips, with a brush, or with the fingers. Lip balms, though designed to moisturise and protect the lips (such as through the addition of UV protection) may also tint the lips.
 Face powder, setting powder, or setting sprays are used to 'set' foundation or concealer, giving it a matte or consistent finish whilst also concealing small flaws or blemishes. Both powders and setting sprays claim to keep makeup from absorbing into the skin or melting off. Whilst setting sprays are generally not tinted, setting powder and face powder can come in translucent or tinted varieties, and can be used to bake foundation in order for it to stay longer on the face. Tinted face powders may also be worn alone without foundation or concealer to give an extremely sheer coverage base.
 Nail polish is a liquid used to colour the fingernails and toenails. Transparent, colorless nail polishes may be used to strengthen nails or be used as a top or base coat to protect the nail or nail polish. Nail polish, like eyeshadow, is available in every colour and a number of different finishes, including matte, shimmer, glossy and crackle finishes.

Skincare

Cleansing is a standard step in skin care routines. Skin cleansing includes some or all of these steps or cosmetics:
 Cleansers or foaming washes are used to remove excess dirt, oil, and makeup left on the skin. Different cleansing products are aimed at various types of skin, such as sulfate-free cleansers and spin brushes.
 Cleansing oil or oil cleanser is an oil-based solution that gently emulsifies the skin's natural oils and removes makeup. Cleansing oils are typically used as part of a two-step cleansing process. After the skin has been cleansed with an oil cleanser, a second cleanse is done using a mild gel, milk or cream cleanser to ensure any traces of the oil cleanser and makeup are removed.
 Toners are used after cleansing to remove any remaining traces of cleanser and restore the pH of the skin. They also may add some hydration. They are usually applied to a cotton pad and wiped over the skin, but can be sprayed onto the skin from a spray bottle or poured onto the hand and patted directly onto the skin. Toners usually contain water, citric acid, herbal extracts and other ingredients. Witch hazel is still commonly used in toners to tighten the pores and refresh the skin. Alcohol is used less often as it is drying and can be irritating to the skin. It may still be found in toners specially for those with oily skin. Some toners contain active ingredients and target particular skin types, such as tea tree oil, salicylic acid, or glycolic acid.
 Hyperpigmentation treatment: Kojic Acid soap, cream or powder and Arbutin (b-D-glucopyranoside derivative of hydroquinone) serum or cream helps to get rid of hyperpigmentation spots of the skin.
 Facial masks are treatments applied to the skin and then removed. Typically, they are applied to a dry, cleansed face, avoiding the eyes and lips.
 Clay-based masks use kaolin clay or fuller's earth to transport essential oils and chemicals to the skin, and are typically left on until completely dry. As the clay dries, it absorbs excess oil and dirt from the surface of the skin and may help to clear blocked pores or draw comedones to the surface. Because of its drying actions, clay-based masks should only be used on oily skins.
 Peel masks are typically gel-like in consistency and contain acids or exfoliating agents to help exfoliate the skin, along with other ingredients to hydrate, discourage wrinkles, or treat uneven skin tone. They are left on to dry and then gently peeled off. They should be avoided by people with dry or sensitive skin, as they tend to be very drying.
 Sheet masks are a relatively new product that are becoming extremely popular in Asia. Sheet masks consist of a thin cotton or fiber sheet with holes cut out for the eyes and lips and cut to fit the contours of the face, onto which serums and skin treatments are brushed in a thin layer; the sheets may be soaked in the treatment. Masks are available to suit almost all skin types and skin complaints. Sheet masks are quicker, less messy, and require no specialized knowledge or equipment for their use compared to other types of face masks, but they may be difficult to find and purchase outside Asia.
 Exfoliants are products that help slough off dead skin cells from the topmost layer of the skin to improve the appearance of the skin. This is achieved either by using mild acids or other chemicals to loosen old skin cells or lightly abrasive substances to physically remove them. Exfoliation can also help even out patches of rough skin, improve cell turnover, clear blocked pores to discourage acne, and improve the appearance and healing of scars.
 Chemical exfoliants include azelaic acid, citric acid, acetic acid, malic acid, mandelic acid, glycolic acid, lactic acid, salicylic acid, papain and bromelain. They may be found in cleansers, scrubs and peels, but also leave-on products such as toners, serums and moisturisers. Chemical exfoliants mainly fall into the categories of AHAs, BHAs, PHAs or enzymes.
 Abrasive exfoliants include gels, creams or lotions, as well as physical objects.
 Moisturizers are creams or lotions that hydrate the skin and help it to retain moisture.  Typical components are polyols such as glycerol and sorbitol as well as partially hydrolyzed proteins.Tinted moisturizers contain a small amount of foundation, which can provide light coverage for minor blemishes or to even out skin tones. They are usually applied with the fingertips or a cotton pad. 
 Eyes require a different kind of moisturizer compared with the rest of the face. The skin around the eyes is extremely thin and sensitive, and is often the first area to show signs of aging. Eye creams are typically very light lotions or gels, and are usually very gentle; some may contain ingredients such as caffeine or Vitamin K to reduce puffiness and dark circles under the eyes. Eye creams or gels should be applied over the entire eye area with a finger, using a patting motion. Finding a moisturizer with SPF is beneficial to prevent aging and wrinkles.
 Sunscreens are creams, lotions, sprays, gels, sticks, or other topical projects that protect the skin from the sun; they contain organic or inorganic filters which act to absorb or reflect harmful UV radiation.  Sunscreens are marked with 'spf' which means 'sun protection factor' this shows that a product provides protection against UVB. UVA ratings on sunscreens can be denoted by the amount of stars or plus symbols varying amongst countries.  It is to be noted UVA ratings do not specifically depict the amount of UVA protection a sunscreen is providing but rather the ratio of equal UVA and UVB protection.  The recommended 'gold standard' of a sunscreen should be at least SPF 30 and at least 4 stars or plus symbols.  Daily sunscreen application is very important but uses of shade, clothing, and hats are as important and more effective for sun protection.
 Serums are light and easily absorbed liquids that one spreads on their skin. The main purpose of the product is to apply before moisturizer and the serum provides a high concentration of any specific ingredient on the face. The benefits to serum are skin firmness, smoothness of face, and reducing the fine lines and wrinkles on ones face.

Hair care
Hair care is a category of cosmetics devoted to products which are used to improve the appearance of hair.
 Shampoos are used to clean the hair and scalp by massaging into wet hair and then rinsing.
 Hair conditioners are used following shampoo to improve the appearance of hair by making it smoother and shinier.
 Styling products include gels, waxes, foams, creams, mousse, serum and pomades; they are used to create and maintain hairstyles.

Perfume
Perfumes or fragrances are liquids which can be sprayed or applied to produce a long-lasting smell. They are created by mixing different compounds together. There are different groups of perfumes which are categorised according to their concentration.
 Parfum
 Eau de parfum
 Eau de toilette
 Eau fraiche

The difference between Eau de parfum and Eau de toilette is more about the perfume oil concentration. Eau de parfum has a higher concentration of perfume oil than Eau de toilette

Tools 

Various tools are used to apply cosmetics.

Brushes 
 A makeup brush is used to apply makeup onto the face. There are two types of makeup brushes: synthetic and natural. Synthetic brushes are best for cream products while natural brushes are ideal for powder products. Using the appropriate brush to apply a certain product allows the product to blend into the skin smoothly and evenly.
 A foundation brush is usually a dense brush that distributes the product evenly while smoothing out the face. This brush is best used to achieve full coverage.
 A concealer brush has a small, tapered tip that allows for precise spot correction such as blemishes or discoloration.
 A stippling brush has soft, synthetic bristles that gives an airbrushed effect. This brush is best used to achieve light to medium coverage.
 A blush brush comes in all shapes and sizes and is used to apply blush, allowing the blush to look natural while giving a flush of color.
 A powder brush tends to be big and fluffy for quick and easy application of dusting powder all over the face. Powder gives the appearance of a matte effect.
 A bronzer blush, which can also serve as a contour brush is an angled brush that gives the face dimensions and illusions, by allowing the makeup to be placed in substitution of bone structure. This brush can also be used to add a shimmering highlight illusion to the cheekbones, nose and chin.
 A highlight brush, also known as a fan brush, has bristles that are typically spread out and is used to apply where the sun would naturally hit.
 An eyeshadow brush is a dense brush that allows shadow to be packed onto the eyelid.
 A blending eyeshadow brush is used to blend out any harsh lines you may have from the eyeshadow and can soften the eyeshadow look.
 An eyeliner brush is tapered with an extra fine tip used for gel eyeliners which allows precision to line the eyes.
 A spoolie is used to brush out the eyebrows and can also be used as a mascara wand.
 A lip brush is small to ensure precision and is used to apply lipstick evenly onto the lips.
 An eyebrow brush is tapered and is slanting from the top, which tends to define the eyebrows and fill in the empty spaces between brows, to give them a fuller and denser look.
 A Kabuki brush is used to apply any sort of powder makeup on large surfaces of the face (loose powder, foundation, face powder, blush, bronzer). This brush is used to evenly the skin.

Other applicators 
In addition to brushes, a makeup sponge is a popular applicator. Makeup sponges can be used to apply foundation, blend concealer, and apply powder or highlighter.

Loofahs, microfiber cloths, natural sponges, or brushes may be used to exfoliate skin, simply by rubbing them over the face in a circular motion. Gels, creams, or lotions may contain an acid to encourage dead skin cells to loosen, and an abrasive such as microbeads, sea salt and sugar, ground nut shells, rice bran, or ground apricot kernels to scrub the dead cells off the skin. Salt and sugar scrubs tend to be the harshest, while scrubs containing beads or rice bran are typically very gentle.

Ingredients 

A variety of organic compounds and inorganic compounds comprise typical cosmetics. Typical organic compounds are modified natural oils and fats as well as a variety of petrochemically derived agents. Inorganic compounds are processed minerals such as iron oxides, talc, and zinc oxide. The oxides of zinc and iron are classified as pigments, i.e. colorants that have no solubility in solvents. Cosmetic companies have become more transparent in the ingredients of their products because consumers are interested in the formula of their products.

Natural 

Handmade and certified organic products are becoming more mainstream, due to consumer concerns that certain chemicals in some skincare products may be harmful if absorbed through the skin. The FDA, which regulates the US cosmetic industry, says "FDA has not defined the term “natural” and has not established a regulatory definition for this term in cosmetic labeling."  It goes on to warn consumers, "choosing ingredients from sources you consider “organic” or “natural” is no guarantee that they are safe."  Because products marketed as "Natural" often fetch a premium price, consumers are warned to be wary of such marketing claims.  Natural is not always better or safer.  An ingredient such as poison ivy would be considered natural but would still be undesirable as a skin care ingredient.

Mineral 
The term "mineral makeup" applies to a category of face makeup, including foundation, eye shadow, blush, and bronzer, made with loose, dry mineral powders. These powders are often mixed with oil-water emulsions. Lipsticks, liquid foundations, and other liquid cosmetics, as well as compressed makeups such as eye shadow and blush in compacts, are often called mineral makeup if they have the same primary ingredients as dry mineral makeups. Liquid makeups must contain preservatives and compressed makeups must contain binders, which dry mineral makeups do not. Mineral makeup usually does not contain synthetic fragrances, preservatives, parabens, mineral oil, and chemical dyes. For this reason, dermatologists may consider mineral makeup to be gentler to the skin than makeup that contains those ingredients. Some minerals are nacreous or pearlescent, giving the skin a shining or sparking appearance. One example is bismuth oxychloride. There are various mineral-based makeup brands, including: Bare Minerals, Tarte, Bobbi Brown, and Stila.

Porous minerals 
Porous minerals is a subcategory of mineral makeup ingredients where the porosity of the mineral particles enables extraordinary absorption capacity compared to non-porous mineral materials. This feature improves sebum control, long-lasting mattifying effect or gives a matte texture when used in makeup. Porous minerals can also act as carriers, absorbing a wide range of substances into its porous network.

Advertised benefits of mineral-based makeup 
Although some ingredients in cosmetics may cause concerns, some are seen as beneficial. Titanium dioxide, found in sunscreens, and zinc oxide have anti-inflammatory properties. Many mineral based makeup create a barrier between the skin and outside elements, which allows it to provide some protection against the sun and its possible harmful effects.

Mineral makeup is noncomedogenic (as long as it does not contain talc) and offers a mild amount of sun protection (because of the titanium dioxide and zinc oxide).

Packaging 

The term cosmetic packaging is used for primary packaging and secondary packaging of cosmetic products.

Primary packaging, also called cosmetic container, is housing the cosmetic product. It is in direct contact with the cosmetic product. Secondary packaging is the outer wrapping of one or several cosmetic container(s). An important difference between primary and secondary packaging is that any information that is necessary to clarify the safety of the product must appear on the primary package. Otherwise, much of the required information can appear on just the secondary packaging.

Cosmetic packaging is standardized by the ISO 22715, set by the International Organization for Standardization and regulated by national or regional regulations such as those issued by the EU or the FDA. Marketers and manufacturers of cosmetic products must be compliant to these regulations to be able to market their cosmetic products in the corresponding areas of jurisdiction.

Industry 

The manufacture of cosmetics is dominated by a small number of multinational corporations that originated in the early 20th century, but the distribution and sales of cosmetics is spread among a wide range of businesses. The world's largest cosmetic companies are L'Oréal, Procter & Gamble, Unilever, Shiseido, and Estée Lauder. In 2005, the market volume of the cosmetics industry in the US, Europe, and Japan was about EUR 70 Billion/a year. In Germany, the cosmetic industry generated €12.6 billion of retail sales in 2008, which makes the German cosmetic industry the third largest in the world, after Japan and the United States. German exports of cosmetics reached €5.8 billion in 2008, whereas imports of cosmetics totaled €3 billion.

The worldwide cosmetics and perfume industry currently generates an estimated annual turnover of US$170 billion (according to Eurostaf – May 2007). Europe is the leading market, representing approximately €63 billion, while sales in France reached €6.5 billion in 2006, according to FIPAR (Fédération des Industries de la Parfumerie – the French federation for the perfume industry). France is another country in which the cosmetic industry plays an important role, both nationally and internationally. According to data from 2008, the cosmetic industry has grown constantly in France for 40 consecutive years. In 2006, this industrial sector reached a record level of €6.5 billion. Famous cosmetic brands produced in France include Vichy, Yves Saint Laurent, Yves Rocher, and many others.

The Italian cosmetic industry is also an important player in the European cosmetic market. Although not as large as in other European countries, the cosmetic industry in Italy was estimated to reach €9 billion in 2007. The Italian cosmetic industry is dominated by hair and body products and not makeup as in many other European countries. In Italy, hair and body products make up approximately 30% of the cosmetic market. Makeup and facial care are the most common cosmetic products exported to the United States.

According to Euromonitor International, the market for cosmetics in China is expected to be $7.4 billion in 2021 up from $4.3 billion in 2016. The increase is due to social media and the changing attitudes of people in the 18-to-30-year age bracket.

Due to the popularity of cosmetics, especially fragrances and perfumes, many designers who are not necessarily involved in the cosmetic industry came up with perfumes carrying their names. Moreover, some actors and singers (such as Celine Dion) have their own perfume line. Designer perfumes are, like any other designer products, the most expensive in the industry as the consumer pays for the product and the brand. Famous Italian fragrances are produced by Giorgio Armani, Dolce & Gabbana, and others.

Procter & Gamble, which sells CoverGirl and Dolce & Gabbana makeup, funded a study concluding that makeup makes women seem more competent. Due to the source of funding, the quality of this Boston University study is questioned.

Cosmetics products may be retailed in beauty stores, department stores and hypermarkets, drugstores, variety stores, grocery stores, beauty supply stores, and many other formats, and in similar types of online stores or the online presence of these types of physical stores.

Cosmetic companies have changed their traditional methods of marketing by using social media influencers and brand ambassadors to market their products.

Controversy 

During the 20th century, the popularity of cosmetics increased rapidly. Cosmetics are used by girls at increasingly young ages, especially in the United States. Because of the fast-decreasing age of makeup users, many companies, from high-street brands like Rimmel to higher-end products like Estee Lauder, cater to this expanding market by introducing flavored lipsticks and glosses, cosmetics packaged in glittery and sparkly packaging, and marketing and advertising using young models. The social consequences of younger and younger cosmetics use has had much attention in the media over the last few years.

Criticism of cosmetics has come from a wide variety of sources including some feminists, religious groups, animal rights activists, authors, and public interest groups. It has also faced criticism from men, some of whom describe it as a form of deception or fakeup.

Safety 
In the United States: "Under the law, cosmetic products and ingredients do not need FDA premarket approval." The EU and other regulatory agencies around the world have more stringent regulations. The FDA does not have to approve or review cosmetics, or what goes in them, before they are sold to the consumers. The FDA only regulates against some colors that can be used in the cosmetics and hair dyes. The cosmetic companies do not have to report any injuries from the products; they also only have voluntary recalls of products.

There has been a marketing trend towards the sale of cosmetics lacking controversial ingredients, especially those derived from petroleum, sodium lauryl sulfate (SLS), and parabens. Per- and polyfluoroalkyl substances (PFAS) are a class of about 9,000 synthetic organofluorine compounds that have multiple highly toxic fluorine atoms attached to an alkyl chain. PFAS are used by major cosmetics industry companies in a wide range of cosmetics, including such products as lipstick, eye liner, mascara,  foundation, concealer, lip balm,  blush, nail polish. A 2021 study tested 231 personal care products and found organic fluorine, a hallmark of PFAS, in more than half of the samples. Substantial levels of fluorine were identified in tested brands of products as follows: 82% of the brands of waterproof mascara, 63% of the brands of foundations, and 62% of liquid lipstick. PFAS compounds are readily absorbed through human skin and through tear ducts, and such products on lips are often unwittingly ingested. Manufacturers often fail to label their products as containing PFAS, which makes it difficult for cosmetics consumers to avoid products containing PFAS.

Formaldehyde is no longer used in cosmetics but has been replaced by formaldehyde releasers. Formaldehyde is dangerous to human health. In 2011, the US National Toxicology Program described formaldehyde as "known to be a human carcinogen".

The danger of formaldehyde is a major reason for the development of formaldehyde releasers which release formaldehyde slowly at lower levels.

Numerous reports have raised concern over the safety of a few surfactants, including 2-butoxyethanol. In some individuals, SLS may cause a number of skin problems, including dermatitis. Additionally, some individuals have had an emergence of vitiliago after using cosmetics containing the ingredient rhododendrol.

Parabens can cause skin irritation and contact dermatitis in individuals with paraben allergies, a small percentage of the general population. Animal experiments have shown that parabens have a weak estrogenic activity, acting as xenoestrogens.

Perfumes are widely used in consumer products. Studies concluded from patch testing show fragrances contain some ingredients which may cause allergic reactions.

Balsam of Peru was the main recommended marker for perfume allergy before 1977, which is still advised. The presence of Balsam of Peru in a cosmetic will be denoted by the INCI term Myroxylon pereirae. In some instances, Balsam of Peru is listed on the ingredient label of a product by one of its various names, but it may not be required to be listed by its name by mandatory labeling conventions (in fragrances, for example, it may simply be covered by an ingredient listing of "fragrance").

Some cosmetics companies have made pseudo-scientific claims about their products which are misleading or unsupported by scientific evidence.

Animal testing 

As of 2019 an estimated 50-100 million animals are tested on each year in locations such as the United States and China. Such tests have involved general toxicity, eye and skin irritants, phototoxicity (toxicity triggered by ultraviolet light), and mutagenicity. Due to the ethical concerns around animal testing, some nations have legislated against animal testing for cosmetics. An updated list can be found on the Humane Societies website. According to the Humane Society of the United States, there are nearly 50 non-animal tests that have been validated for use, with many more in development, that may replace animal testing and are potentially more efficacious. In the United States, mice, rats, rabbits, and cats are the most used animals for testing. In 2018, California banned the sale of animal-tested cosmetics.

Cosmetics testing is banned in the Netherlands, India, Norway, Israel, New Zealand, Belgium, and the UK, and in 2002, the European Union agreed to phase in a near-total ban on the sale of animal-tested cosmetics throughout the EU from 2009, and to ban all cosmetics-related animal testing. In December 2009, the European Parliament and Council passed the EC Regulation 1223/2009 on cosmetics, a bill to regulate the cosmetic industry in the EU. EC Regulation 1223/2009 took effect on July 11, 2013. In March 2013, the EU banned the import and sale of cosmetics containing ingredients tested on animals. China required animal testing on cosmetic products until 2014, when they waived animal testing requirements for domestically produced products. In 2019, China approved nine non-animal testing methods, and announced that by 2020 laws making animal testing compulsory would be lifted.

In June 2017, legislation was proposed in Australia to end animal testing in the cosmetics industry. In March 2019, the Australian Senate passed a bill banning the use of data from animal testing in the cosmetic industry after July 1, 2020.

Legislation

Europe 
In the European Union, the manufacture, labelling, and supply of cosmetics and personal care products are regulated by Regulation EC 1223/2009. It applies to all the countries of the EU as well as Iceland, Norway, and Switzerland. This regulation applies to single-person companies making or importing just one product as well as to large multinationals. Manufacturers and importers of cosmetic products must comply with the applicable regulations in order to sell their products in the EU. In this industry, it is common fall back on a suitably qualified person, such as an independent third party inspection and testing company, to verify the cosmetics' compliance with the requirements of applicable cosmetic regulations and other relevant legislation, including REACH, GMP, hazardous substances, etc.

In the European Union, the circulation of cosmetic products and their safety has been a subject of legislation since 1976. One of the newest improvement of the regulation concerning cosmetic industry is a result of the ban animal testing. Testing cosmetic products on animals has been illegal in the European Union since September 2004, and testing the separate ingredients of such products on animals is also prohibited by law, since March 2009 for some endpoints and full since 2013.

Cosmetic regulations in Europe are often updated to follow the trends of innovations and new technologies while ensuring product safety. For instance, all annexes of the Regulation 1223/2009 were aimed to address potential risks to human health.
Under the EU cosmetic regulation, manufacturers, retailers, and importers of cosmetics in Europe will be designated as "Responsible Person". This new status implies that the responsible person has the legal liability to ensure that the cosmetics and brands they manufacture or sell comply with the current cosmetic regulations and norms. The responsible person is also responsible of the documents contained in the Product Information File (PIF), a list of product information including data such as Cosmetic Product Safety Report, product description, GMP statement, or product function.

United States 
In 1938, the U.S. passed the Food, Drug, and Cosmetic Act authorizing the Food and Drug Administration (FDA) to oversee safety via legislation in the cosmetic industry and its aspects in the United States. The FDA joined with 13 other federal agencies in forming the Interagency Coordinating Committee on the Validation of Alternative Methods (ICCVAM) in 1997, which is an attempt to ban animal testing and find other methods to test cosmetic products.

The current law on cosmetics in the U.S. does not require cosmetic products and ingredients to have FDA approval before going on the market except from color additives. The Cosmetic Safety Enhancement Act was introduced in December 2019 by Representative Frank Pallone.

Brazil 

ANVISA (Agência Nacional de Vigilância Sanitária, Brazilian Health Surveillance Agency) is the regulatory body responsible for cosmetic legislation and directives in the country. The rules apply to manufacturers, importers, and retailers of cosmetics in Brazil, and most of them have been harmonized so they can apply to the entire Mercosur.

The current legislation restricts the use of certain substances such as pyrogallol, formaldehyde, or paraformaldehyde and bans the use of others such as lead acetate in cosmetic products. All restricted and forbidden substances and products are listed in the regulation RDC 16/11 and RDC 162, 09/11/01.

More recently, a new cosmetic Technical Regulation (RDC 15/2013) was set up to establish a list of authorized and restricted substances for cosmetic use, used in products such as hair dyes, nail hardeners, or used as product preservatives.

Most Brazilian regulations are optimized, harmonized, or adapted in order to be applicable and extended to the entire Mercosur economic zone.

International 
The International Organization for Standardization (ISO) published new guidelines on the safe manufacturing of cosmetic products under a Good Manufacturing Practices (GMP) regime. Regulators in several countries and regions have adopted this standard, ISO 22716:2007, effectively replacing existing guidance and standards.
ISO 22716 provides a comprehensive approach for a quality management system for those engaged in the manufacturing, packaging, testing, storage, and transportation of cosmetic end products. The standard deals with all aspects of the supply chain, from the early delivery of raw materials and components until the shipment of the final product to the consumer.

The standard is based on other quality management systems, ensuring smooth integration with such systems as ISO 9001 or the British Retail Consortium (BRC) standard for consumer products. Therefore, it combines the benefits of GMP, linking cosmetic product safety with overall business improvement tools that enable organisations to meet global consumer demand for cosmetic product safety certification.

In July 2012, since microbial contamination is one of the greatest concerns regarding the quality of cosmetic products, the ISO has introduced a new standard for evaluating the antimicrobial protection of a cosmetic product by preservation efficacy testing and microbiological risk assessment.

See also 

 Airbrush makeup
 Makeup brush
 Baking
 Body art
 Contouring
 Cosmeceutical
 Cosmetic packaging
 Electrotherapy (cosmetic)
 Female cosmetic coalitions
 Henna
 Ingredients of cosmetics
 International Federation of Societies of Cosmetic Chemists
 Male cosmetics
 Moulage
 Natural skin care
 Palm oil
 Permanent makeup
 Skin care

References

Further reading 
 

 
Skin care